The Remixes is an EP released by SWV in 1994. The EP was certified gold for selling 500,000 copies in the U.S. RIAA

Track listing 
"Anything" (featuring Wu-Tang Clan) [Old Skool Radio Version] - 4:56
"Right Here" [Human Nature Duet, Demolition 12" Mix] - 4:58
"I'm So Into You" [Allstar's Drop Check Dance Mix] - 5:51
"Weak" [Bam Jams Jeep Mix] - 5:00
"Downtown" [Jazzy Radio Mix] - 4:36
"You're Always On My Mind" [Radio Version with Piano] - 5:00

Certifications

References

1994 debut EPs
1994 remix albums
RCA Records EPs
RCA Records remix albums
SWV albums